BYU Cougars basketball may refer to either of the basketball teams that represent the Brigham Young University:
BYU Cougars men's basketball
BYU Cougars women's basketball